Specklinia fulgens is a species of orchid plant native to Costa Rica.

References 

fulgens
Flora of Costa Rica